Ad hoc international criminal tribunals include:
International Military Tribunal (1945)
International Military Tribunal for the Far East (1945)
International Criminal Tribunal for the former Yugoslavia (1993)
International Criminal Tribunal for Rwanda (1994)
Special Court for Sierra Leone (2002)
Extraordinary Chambers in the Courts of Cambodia (2004)
Special Tribunal for Lebanon (2009)

References

International courts and tribunals